The Asian giant toad (Phrynoidis asper), sometimes referred to as the river toad, is a species of true toad native to Mainland Southeast Asia and the Greater Sundas. It is a medium-large toad, but it is easily confused with its larger relative, the giant river toad (P. juxtasper).

Description 

Phrynoidis asper is generally a dark grey, green, black or brown in color, and is heavily covered in tubercles. They can be commonly found near stream and rivers.

Gallery

References 

Frogs of the Malay Peninsula: Bufo asper

asper
Amphibians of Brunei
Amphibians of Indonesia
Amphibians of Malaysia
Amphibians of Myanmar
Amphibians of Thailand
Amphibians of Vietnam
Amphibians of Borneo
Fauna of Sumatra
Amphibians described in 1829
Taxa named by Johann Ludwig Christian Gravenhorst